The Walking Dead (also known as The Walking Dead: The Game and later The Walking Dead: Season One) is an episodic adventure video game developed and published by Telltale Games. It is the first game in the series, which consists of 4 seasons and a spin-off game based on Michonne. Based on The Walking Dead comic book series, the game consists of five episodes, released between April and November 2012. It is available for Android, iOS, Kindle Fire HDX, Microsoft Windows, Mac OS X, Ouya, PlayStation 3, PlayStation Vita, Xbox 360, PlayStation 4, Xbox One, and Nintendo Switch. The game is the first of The Walking Dead video game series published by Telltale.

The game takes place in the same fictional world as the comic, with events occurring shortly after the onset of the zombie apocalypse in Georgia. However, most of the characters are original to this game, which centers on university professor and convicted criminal Lee Everett, who rescues and subsequently takes care of a young girl named Clementine. Lee becomes a protective figure to her to help reunite her with her parents. Kirkman provided oversight for the game's story to ensure it corresponded to the tone of the comic, but allowed Telltale to handle the bulk of the developmental work and story specifics. Some characters from the original comic book series also make in-game appearances.

Unlike many graphic adventure games, The Walking Dead does not emphasize puzzle solving, but instead focuses on story and character development. The story is affected by both the dialogue choices of the player and their actions during quick time events, which can often lead to, for example, certain characters being killed, or an adverse change in the disposition of a certain character or characters towards protagonist Lee. The choices made by the player carry over from episode to episode. Choices were tracked by Telltale, and used to influence their writing in later episodes.

The Walking Dead has been critically acclaimed, with reviewers praising the harsh emotional tone of the story and the empathetic connection established between Lee and Clementine. It won year-end accolades, including Game of the Year awards from several gaming publications and is considered to be one of the greatest video games of all time. More than one million unique players have purchased at least one episode from the series, with over 8.5 million individual units sold by the end of 2012, and its success has been seen as constituting a revitalization of the weakened adventure game genre. In July 2013, Telltale released an additional downloadable episode, 400 Days, to extend the first season and bridge the gap towards Telltale's second season, released later that year as well as in 2014. Season 3 and Season 4 of The Walking Dead were released in 2016–2017 and 2018–2019, respectively.

Gameplay
The Walking Dead is a graphic adventure, played from a third-person perspective with a variety of cinematic camera angles, in which the player, as protagonist Lee Everett, works with a rag-tag group of survivors to stay alive in the midst of a zombie apocalypse.}} The player can examine and interact with characters and items, and must make use of inventory items and the environment. Throughout the game, the player is presented with the ability to interact with their surroundings, and options to determine the nature of that interaction. For example, the player may be able to look at a character, talk to that character, or if they are carrying an item, offer it to the character or ask them about it. According to Robert Kirkman, The Walking Dead game is focused more on developing characters and story, and less on the action tropes that tend to feature in other zombie-based games, such as Left 4 Dead.

Some parts of the game require timed responses from the player, often leading to significant decisions that will impact the game's story, in the manner of role-playing games (RPGs). Some conversation trees require the player to make a selection within a limited time, otherwise Lee will remain quiet, which can affect how other characters respond to him. Unlike in other RPGs such as the Mass Effect or Fallout series, where choices fall on either side of a "good or evil" scale, the choices within The Walking Dead have ambiguous results, having an effect on the attitude of the non-player characters towards Lee. The player can opt to enable a "choice notification" feature, in which the game's interface indicates that a character has changed their disposition towards Lee as a result of these choices. In more action-based sequences, the player must follow on-screen prompts for quick time events (QTEs) so as to keep themselves or other characters alive. If the player dies, the game restarts from just prior to the QTE. Other timed situations involve major decisions, such as choosing which of two characters to keep alive.

Each episode contains five points where the player must make a significant decision, choosing from one of two available options. Through Telltale's servers, the game tracks how many players selected which option and lets the player compare their choices to the rest of the player base. The game can be completed regardless of what choices are made in these situations; the main events of the story, as described below, will continue regardless of what choices are made, but the presence and behavior of the non-player characters in later scenes will be affected by these choices. The game does allow the player to make multiple saves, and includes a "rewind" feature where the player can back up and alter a previous decision, thus facilitating the exploration of alternative choices.

Synopsis

Setting and characters

The Walking Dead occurs simultaneously with the events from the original comic series, where a zombie apocalypse overwhelms much of society. Characters in the game come to call the zombies "walkers", due to the slowness of their movement. Although the survivors initially think that being bitten by a zombie is the only way to become infected, it is later discovered that one becomes a zombie upon death irrespective of the manner in which one dies; only by damaging the brain can the reanimation be stopped. As with the comic and television series, the game's events occur in the state of Georgia.

Numerous characters appear throughout the game. Lee Everett (voiced by Dave Fennoy), the primary protagonist, is a native of Macon and a former university professor convicted for killing a state senator who was sleeping with his wife. Lee eventually finds and becomes a father figure to Clementine (voiced by Melissa Hutchison), an eight-year-old whose parents had left for Savannah, leaving her with a babysitter. Lee and Clementine soon encounter a family from Fort Lauderdale, Florida; Kenny (voiced by Gavin Hammon), a fisherman who prioritizes his family above all else; Katjaa, Kenny's wife, who works as a veterinarian (voiced by Cissy Jones); and Kenny and Katjaa's son, Kenny Jr. (voiced by Max Kaufman), nicknamed "Duck". The five join a survivor group led by Lilly (voiced by Nicki Rapp), who was formerly stationed on the Robins Air Force Base. Lilly's group consists of multiple survivors, including Larry (voiced by Terry McGovern), her aggressive and judgmental father, a retired U.S. Army commander who knows Lee's past; Carley (voiced by Nicole Vigil) a quick-thinking regional news reporter who is also aware of Lee's crimes; Doug (voiced by Sam Joan), a resourceful and logical information systems technician; and Glenn Rhee (voiced by Nick Herman), a former pizza delivery boy. In the second episode, two more survivors join the group: Mark (voiced by Mark Middleton), a survivor who used to work for the U.S. Air Force; and Ben Paul (voiced by Trevor Hoffman), a high school student rescued by Lee, Mark and Kenny. Also introduced in the second episode are the farmers-turned-cannibals the St. Johns, consisting of Andy (voiced by Adam Harrington), his brother Danny (voiced by Brian Sommer), and their mother Brenda (voiced by Jeanie Kelsey). In the third episode, more characters are introduced; Chuck (voiced by Roger Jackson), a level-headed homeless man who lives in a boxcar; and Omid and Christa (voiced by Owen Thomas and Mara Junot respectively), a young couple who tend to stay away from large groups. The fourth episode introduces two more characters; Molly (voiced by Erin Ashe), an acrobatic and resourceful young woman who carries an ice axe; and Vernon (voiced by Butch Engle), a doctor and leader of a group of cancer survivors hiding in the morgue of a hospital. The Stranger (voiced by Anthony Lam, and by Roger Jackson through the walkie-talkie) is a mysterious man that communicates to Clementine via her walkie-talkie as the group nears Savannah.

Plot
The following summary is a broad overview of the work, describing the major events that occur regardless of player choice. Some specific elements not listed here will change based on the impact of player choices.

Lee is being taken to prison when the police cruiser he is in crashes off-road after hitting a walker. He escapes, and while taking shelter in a suburban home, meets Clementine, whose parents had traveled to Savannah. The two arrive at the farm of Hershel Greene, meeting Kenny, Katjaa, and their son Duck. After Hershel's son Shawn is killed by walkers, he evicts the others. The group travels to Macon, Lee's hometown, where they join another group barricaded in Lee's family's pharmacy, where Lee discovers his parents and brother are dead. The group is forced to flee but finds a nearby defensible motel to stay. 

Months pass and the group runs low on supplies. They take the offer of providing gasoline to the St. Johns, who run a nearby dairy, in exchange for food, but discover that the family has engaged in cannibalism. The group overcomes the St. Johns and leaves the farm to be overridden by walkers. On their way back to the motel, they come across a car packed with provisions, which they ransack. Some weeks later, the motel is attacked by bandits, which draws a walker horde. The group escapes, though Duck is bitten by a walker. Lee and Kenny are forced to evict Lilly from the group, who has become unstable after losing her father Larry during the events with the St. Johns. They travel to Savannah via train, with plans to find a boat to escape the mainland. En route, Duck succumbs to the bite, and Katjaa commits suicide over her loss. 

Near Savannah, Lee's group meets Omid and Christa who join them. Clementine's walkie-talkie goes off, and a man tells her he has her parents in Savannah. The group sets up shelter in an abandoned mansion before investigating the city. Lee and Kenny go to River Street and discover that all the boats have been taken or destroyed, and useful supplies have been scavenged by the walled community, Crawford. Separated from the others, Lee meets another group of survivors led by Vernon, who helps him return to the mansion, where they discover a parked motorboat in a backyard shed. Lee and the others lead a raid on Crawford for supplies but discover the whole community has been overrun by walkers. Once they return to the mansion, Vernon leaves to return to his group but tells Lee he does not think he is fit to be a guardian for Clementine.

The next morning, Lee finds Clementine missing. In his haste to find her, he is bitten by a walker. He leads the group to a morgue where Vernon's group was but finds they have vacated. Over Clementine's walkie-talkie, the stranger tells Lee to meet them at a downtown hotel, the same that Clementine's parents were staying at. After finding Vernon's group has stolen the boat, Lee's group takes to the rooftops to avoid the walkers in the city streets, but they lose several members, including apparently Kenny. Eventually, Lee becomes separated from Omid and Christa.

Lee continues alone to find Clementine held captive by the stranger, who reveals himself to be the owner of the car the group had previously ransacked and blames Lee for the death of his family due to it. Lee and Clementine kill the stranger, and the two cover themselves in walker guts to mask their scent from the horde roaming outside. While in the streets, Clementine finds her zombified parents, and Lee collapses. When Lee wakes up, he finds Clementine has dragged him into an abandoned store. Lee tells Clementine to escape the city and find Omid and Christa. The player then has the option as Lee to ask Clementine to kill him before he turns or to leave him behind to turn. If he does not decide, Clementine will choose herself based on Lee's previous actions. In a post-credits scene, Clementine, who has escaped the city, sees two figures in the distance who notice her.

400 Days
The downloadable content 400 Days relates stories of other survivors in the zombie apocalypse, starting at its onset and occurring concurrently with the first season. 

There are five main stories:
 Vince (Anthony Lam) has been sentenced to prison for murder, which he had done to help his brother sometime prior to the outbreak. On Day 2 of the outbreak, Vince is on a prison-bound bus with Danny (Erik Braa) and Justin (Trevor Hoffmann) when it is ambushed by walkers. Vince chooses one of the two to escape with, leaving the other to die.
 Wyatt (Jace Smykel) and his friend Eddie (Brandon Bales) have accidentally killed a friend of Nate (Jefferson Arca) and are fleeing from him in a car on Day 41 of the outbreak when they run over one of the prison guards from Vince's bus in a dense fog. One of them gets out to survey the damage but is abandoned when the other one is attacked by Nate and flees in the car.
 Russell (Vegas Trip) is a teenager travelling by foot to visit his grandmother. On Day 184 of the outbreak he is picked up by Nate, who takes Russell to a nearby gas station and truck stop, where they are attacked by an elderly man named Walt. Nate suggests killing and robbing Walt and his wife Jean, with Russell deliberating on staying with Nate or leaving him.
 Bonnie (Erin Yvette) is a former drug-addict traveling with Leland (Adam Harrington) and his wife Dee (Cissy Jones). Dee distrusts Bonnie due to suspecting that Leland is attracted to her. On Day 220 of the outbreak they are pursued by survivors that Dee stole supplies from, forcing them to split up into a corn field. After accidentally killing Dee with a rebar, Bonnie must decide whether to tell Leland the truth or lie.
 Shel (Cissy Jones) and her younger sister Becca (Brett Pels) are members of the group seen in Bonnie's story and are residing in the truck stop seen in Russell's story. Several members are also Vernon's former companions who Lee encountered in Savannah. Roman (Kid Beyond) holds firm control of the group. When a Portuguese scavenger named Roberto attempts to steal from the group on Day 236 of the outbreak, Shel is given the deciding vote on him being killed or allowed to leave. Later on Day 259, fellow group member Stephanie (Dana Bauer) is caught stealing supplies, causing Roman to ask Shel to kill her. Shel then either goes through with it or escapes the camp with Becca on their caravan.

The five stories culminate in a final scene on Day 400 where Tavia (Rashida Clendening) discovers photos of the survivors on a billboard near the now-overrun truck stop, along with a map to a nearby location. She finds the group and offers them sanctuary nearby. Bonnie accepts, with the others either accepting or refusing depending on either their past choices or whether Tavia successfully convinces them.

Episodes
The game was separated into five episodes, released in two-month intervals.

Supplemental episodes 
An additional episode, titled 400 Days, was released in July 2013 as downloadable content, bridging the gap between the first and second season. It focuses on five new characters, and is presented in a nonlinear narrative style; players can approach the five stories in any order they choose.

Development

Early development and rights acquisition
Prior to The Walking Dead, Telltale Games had made several successful episodic adventure games based on established properties, including three seasons of Sam & Max based on the comics and prior video games, and the five-episode Tales of Monkey Island, based upon the Monkey Island video game series. In 2010, the company secured the rights to two licensed movie properties from Universal Studios, resulting in Back to the Future: The Game and Jurassic Park: The Game. The latter included elements atypical of adventure games, including more action-oriented sequences incorporating quick time events, and was inspired by Quantic Dream's Heavy Rain.

Sean Vanaman said prior to getting the rights to The Walking Dead, Telltale's Carl Muckenhoupt had been working on a text-based prototype adventure game with a key gameplay focus of having an "active world", in which objects and characters in the environment would continue to go about their actions even if the player did not respond to them. Dave Grossman called this one of the long-standing problems that adventure games had had, as games in the past would have otherwise had to wait for player input. Telltale had approached Valve about using this concept for a Left 4 Dead spinoff game, another series that involved zombies, but these discussions failed to result in anything.

In February 2011, Telltale announced simultaneous deals with Robert Kirkman and Warner Bros. to develop episodic series based on both The Walking Dead and Fables, respectively. For The Walking Dead, the agreement included provisions for "multi-year, multi-platform, multi-title" arrangements, with an initial episodic series release to commence in the fourth quarter of 2011.

Writing
During development of the game, Robert Kirkman and the comic publisher Skybound Entertainment worked with Telltale. According to Kirkman, he had previously played Telltale's Strong Bad's Cool Game for Attractive People, and felt that they "were more focused on telling a good story, and I thought they were good at engaging the player in the narrative." Telltale approached him with a proposal which, according to Kirkman, "involved decision-making and consequences rather than ammunition gathering or jumping over things." The proposal's emphasis on the survival aspect of the comics, and the need for the player to make choices between two bad options sold him on the project. Since then, Kirkman became involved with Telltale, mostly providing oversight on what aspects of the story were appropriate components of The Walking Dead universe, in much the same manner as he does for the television show, staying out of the direct development process. Dan Connors, CEO of Telltale, stated that working with Kirkman made it easier for Telltale to craft its story and introduce new characters, instead of having to work with those already established in the comic. One of the few demands Kirkman asked of Telltale was to avoid telling anything involved with the comic's main character, Rick Grimes, as Kirkman has stated long-term plans with the character in other media. Kirkman had not been impressed with an early build of the first episode, but by the time they had presented him with a near-final build, Kirkman told the Telltale team, "Holy shit guys, you did it", according to the game's co-lead developer Jake Rodkin.

Connors stated that from a gameplay perspective, they had looked to games such as Heavy Rain and the Uncharted series as a basis for in-game cinematics, while the idea of giving the player choice was influenced by the Mass Effect series. In addition to the television version of The Walking Dead, Telltale took cues from Game of Thrones and Mad Men in terms of how to develop characters within a brief time. Connors also noted that he found that traditional conversation trees did not possess "a believable rhythm" to dialog, and developed a conversion system, using timed input, to create more natural-sounding dialog.

The game's story was written with the final scene in the fifth episode, where Clementine either shoots Lee or walks away to let him become a walker, as the established ending that the game would build towards. As such, the character of Clementine was considered critical to the game's writing, and the team spent much time making her the "moral compass" for the game, while assuring that as a child character, she would not come off to the player as whining or annoying. Similarly, the scene with the Stranger in the hotel room was planned very early in development, and also used to review the player's decisions on a moral basis, allowing the player to respond, if they desired, to the allegations. Each episode was developed by pairing a writer and a game designer so that the plot and gameplay style for that episode would work in cooperation and avoid having one feel detached from the other, according to Vanaman. As such, certain gameplay ideas were left out of the game; one example given by Vanaman was a scene where everyone in the survivor group was firing on a wall of zombies, but as this would lead to a discrete success or failure, it did not fit in with the sense of panic they wanted to convey in the scene.

Choice
A major aspect in the writing The Walking Dead was the concept of death, whether for the player or non-player characters. Telltale itself was formed from many former LucasArts employees, who had previously written games where the player could not die. As such, they introduced situations where Lee would die if the player did not react fast enough, although the game would restart just before these events, and situations where non-player characters would die based on the player's on-the-spot decisions. The concept of requiring the players to respond in a limited amount of time came out of the prototype zombie game that Muckenhoupt had made. This timing aspect was designed to maintain the game's pace, and led to the idea of tracking the player's decisions. Telltale's development tools and engines had previously included means of tracking players' progress, but the use in The Walking Dead was more explicit, revealing global statistics. 

The ultimate goal of introducing non-game-ending choices into the game was to make the player more invested in the story and more likely to avoid using the rewind feature. Telltale spent a great deal of time to assure that no choice would appear to be punishing to the player, though ultimately "all choices are equally wrong", according to Whitta. The writers wanted to create choices that would appear to have a significant impact on the story but ultimately would be mostly inconsequential to the larger story. At major decision points, the writers' aim was try to have the audience split evenly by making the dialog as neutral as possible prior to the choice; they considered that a split of 75 to 25 percent was not ideal. They noted such cases occurred in both the first episode, where the player has an option to save Carley (the "hot reporter with a gun") or Doug (the "dorky dude"), with the vast majority of players saving Carley, and in the second episode, where the player is given the option to cut off Parker's leg before they are attacked by walkers or leave him behind, with most players cutting off the leg. As such, in subsequent episodes, they worked to modify dialog to eliminate any sense of suggestion, leaving the notion of the 'right' choice ambiguous, and totally up to the player themself.

In some cases, the writers had to work around the established characters and chronology from the comic series. In the first episode, for example, the player is introduced to Hershel Greene, who is established in the comics as a bitter character due to witnessing his son Shawn turn into a walker in the early stages of the outbreak. One of the first decisions the player makes is whether to save Shawn or Duck; however, either choice results in Shawn being bitten, so as to maintain the comic's continuity; only the manner in which he is bitten is changed. The major consequence aspect of the choice instead involves how Kenny feels towards Lee. In other cases, Telltale designed scenes and choices knowing how the majority of players would be predisposed to certain characters. One example is the character of Larry, who is introduced in the first episode as a hard-nosed jerk. Based on the statistical feedback, Telltale recognized that most players would want to either abandon or kill Larry at the first opportunity, and as such, they created a conversation tree in episode two where Lilly goes some way to redeem Larry in the eyes of the player. The idea was that this might influence the player when they must choose whether to help Kenny kill Larry, who may, or may not, have died from a heart attack and be on the verge of turning. Telltale found that 75% of the players now wanted to save Larry, a result they had expected.

The writers also used the decision statistics from previous episodes to develop the direction of future ones. Gary Whitta, the writer of the fourth episode, specifically reviewed all the statistics from the previous three episodes to determine the general development of the episode's story. One example involved the death of Duck in the third episode. In that episode, the player must choose to either kill Duck for Kenny, or have Kenny do it himself. In the fourth episode, Whitta wrote a scene where Kenny finds a similar-looking boy, who has starved to death in an attic and come back as a walker. Again, the player is faced with the choice of whether to kill the boy themselves or have Kenny do it. They also included a third choice, in which the player would simply walk away, leaving the boy as a walker trapped in the attic, but this decision would harshly affect the disposition of the others characters towards Lee. By the first act of episode 5, there were 32 variations due to past player choices that they had to write towards. The number of possible scenarios were considered necessary to make the game feel "organic" to the individual player, making the player feel like they weaved their own story within the game instead of just taking a specific route through the choices.

Art
Telltale's art director, Derek Sakai, led the creation of the characters and their expressions. Sakai was told to not use symmetric expressions to help create more human-like expressions and help improve the realism of the game. Sakai drew inspiration from his own daughter to develop the character of Clementine.

Soundtrack
On September 10, 2019, an official soundtrack album of Jared Emerson-Johnson's B.A.F.T.A. Award nominated score to the game was released for digital download and on streaming services, with a special edition set of vinyl lps due to release shortly thereafter.

Multi-platform
The game engine used for The Walking Dead was optimized so as to facilitate the multi-platform nature of the release, which included PCs, gaming consoles and mobile devices, with the aim of minimizing the work in porting. However, the development team still focused on achieving the best control schemes for each platform; in particular, the touchscreen control scheme on mobile devices was based on experience gained during the development of the Back to the Future game. A major challenge through the development of all five episodes was the save game file format, which they continually had to update and fix across platforms, in some cases causing existing save files to become invalid. Unique fixes applied for earlier episodes on one platform would reappear as problems in later ones. Connors stated that for the next series, they would be "a lot more diligent" on the save game issues, using data gathered during the first season development and information on how players would approach the game.

In previous series developed by Telltale for multiple platforms, they had had difficulty in timing releases to reach all players at the same time. One aspect of this was due to issues encountered on the Xbox Live Arcade service for the Xbox 360; for small publishers, like Telltale at the time, they had to arrange with larger publishers to allocate a slot within the Arcade's release schedule several months in advance, making it difficult to coordinate with releases on other platforms. After the success of the Back to the Future and Jurassic Park games, however, Telltale were able to officially achieve a publisher status on Xbox Live, giving them more control of the release schedule. Furthermore, they had designed the game such that the second through fifth episodes would be treated as downloadable content, allowing them to bypass slot scheduling and assuring same-day release on both PCs and consoles.

Downloadable content and sequels

The first series proved successful, leading Telltale to begin development of a second episodic season. The first episode of the second season was released in late 2013. According to Connors, Telltale incorporates what players liked best from the previous seasons, while considering how and by what means they will continue the story, and include the possibility of tying in more of the characters from the television show.

In February 2013, Whitta suggested that there may also be some material released before the second season to tide players over until then. This was revealed to be the aforementioned 400 Days downloadable content, revealed at the 2013 Electronic Entertainment Expo following a week of brief Vine video teaser movies posted by Telltale, introducing the five main characters in the added episode. The content uses information from the player's saved game from the first season, and decisions made within 400 Days will continue into season two. The content was made available on the game's existing platforms between July 2 and 11, 2013, while a special bundled edition of the PlayStation Vita, including the full The Walking Dead game and 400 Days content, was released on August 20, 2013. A "Game of the Year" edition of The Walking Dead, including all five episodes and 400 Days, was released for retail for the Microsoft Windows, Xbox 360, and PlayStation 3 platforms on November 19, 2013.

A three episode mini-series, The Walking Dead: Michonne, based on the character Michonne, was released in February 2016. The first episode of third season, The Walking Dead: A New Frontier, was released on December 20, 2016, with physical season pass disc released on February 7, 2017. A fourth and final season, The Walking Dead: The Final Season, has since been released in 2018, and concluded in 2019.

Marketing and release
The Walking Dead was originally announced as a five-episode series with approximately monthly releases as digital downloads for Microsoft Windows, OS X, Xbox 360, and PlayStation 3 systems. Its release was slated for late 2011, but it was ultimately pushed back to April 2012. This date was shortly after the conclusion of the final episode of the second season of The Walking Dead television show, providing a means for the game to ride the popularity of the show.

Telltale later announced that they would provide a disc-based release of the complete game for these platforms on December 11, 2012, after the release of the fifth episode. Exclusive to GameStop stores in North America is the Collector's Edition, which includes new artwork by Charlie Adlard and The Walking Dead: Compendium One, a book consisting of the first 48 issues of the comic series by Robert Kirkman. Following the retail release, some Xbox 360 owners without large storage options reported stuttering issues with the disc-based game; Telltale compensated these users with free codes to download the full series digitally.

An iOS version of the game was announced in August 2012, with episodes released shortly after their computer/console debut. Later, after the full release of all five episodes to the App Store, Telltale offered the first episode for free, something they had done in the past, as doing so, according to Dan Connors, "opens the funnel and gets it out to more people who can then convert into the [full] game".

In March 2013, Telltale announced that The Walking Dead will be ported to the PlayStation Vita, later revealed in June 2013 to be a retail release, including a special Vita bundle package that would include the game, the 400 Days episode, and additional content.

In November 2013, Telltale announced that a Game of the Year edition of The Walking Dead was to be released for PC, Xbox 360 and PlayStation 3 through retail. It will includes the five episodes, the 400 Days DLC episode, the original score and a behind-the-scenes feature. Releases for the PlayStation 4 and Xbox One consoles were announced in May 2014 and released in October later that year. A version for the Nintendo Switch was released on August 28, 2018, which included the 400 Days downloadable content.

A virtual pinball table, developed jointly by Telltale Games and Zen Studios, was released on August 27, 2014 as downloadable content for Zen Pinball 2 and Pinball FX 2, as well as a separate, paid app on iOS and Android.  The pinball adaptation is uniquely designed such that the table is shaped and surrounded by scale representations of set pieces and locales of all five episodes, and exclusively features 3-D, animated models of Lee and Clementine.

Reception

The Walking Dead has received critical acclaim, with reviewers giving praise for the harsh emotional tone, the characters, story and the resemblance to the original comic book, although criticizing the graphical glitches. The game received over 80 Game of the Year awards and many other awards.

"Episode 1 – A New Day" received positive reviews. Aggregating review websites GameRankings and Metacritic gave the PlayStation 3 version 85.14% and 84/100, the Xbox 360 version 83.87% and 79/100 and the PC version 83.38% and 82/100. The game received various accolades including the IGN "Editors' Choice", PC Gamer "Editors' Choice", Xbox Editors' Choice Award, and the PlayStation Gold Award.

"Episode 2 – Starved for Help" received positive reviews. Aggregating review websites GameRankings and Metacritic gave the PC version 86.53% and 84/100, the Xbox 360 version 86.26% and 84/100 and the PlayStation 3 version 85.90% and 84/100. The game won the GameSpy E3 2012 award for "Best Adventure Game".

"Episode 3 – Long Road Ahead" received positive reviews. Aggregating review websites GameRankings and Metacritic gave the Xbox 360 version 88.47% and 88/100, the PlayStation 3 version 86.11% and 87/100 and the PC version 85.41% and 85/100. IGN's Greg Miller gave it a 9 out of 10, saying "It's a disturbing, depressing and entertaining entry in a journey that's been nothing short of excellent so far." GameSpot gave the game an 8.5, saying "The Walking Dead has passed the midway point of its series of five episodes with every indication that the game will keep getting better right through to its inevitably depressing and unsettling conclusion." MTV also gave it a positive review, saying "Telltale has created a series of wrenching, emotional decisions in the middle of a collection of not-too-hard puzzles in a visually-impressive adaptation of the Robert Kirkman comic series (with some nods to the TV show)."

"Episode 4 – Around Every Corner" received positive reviews. Aggregating review websites GameRankings and Metacritic gave the PC version 84.00% and 80/100, the Xbox 360 version 82.50% and 82/100 and the PlayStation 3 version 78.94% and 81/100.

"Episode 5 – No Time Left" received critical acclaim. Aggregating review websites GameRankings and Metacritic gave the PC version 94.75% and 89/100, the Xbox 360 version 88.15% and 89/100 and the PlayStation 3 version 87.75% and 88/100.

400 Days received positive reviews. Aggregating review websites GameRankings and Metacritic gave the PlayStation 3 version 78.20% and 78/100, the PC version 78.00% and 78/100 and the Xbox 360 version 76.88% and 80/100.

Sales
The Walking Dead was a financial success, aided by the ease of digital distribution. The first episode topped the charts on Xbox Live Arcade for the week of April 30, and remained at the top for two weeks. It also topped the sales charts for both PlayStation Network and Steam for a week. The first episode sold one million copies in 20 days (not including iOS sales), making it Telltale's fastest selling title to date. With the third episode's release, over 3.8 million episodes were delivered to 1.2 million players. As of January 2013, over 8.5 million episodes have been sold across all platforms, representing about $40 million in revenue. Telltale's CEO Dan Connors has stated that the iOS version represented about 25% of their overall sales, the "largest upswing" for any platform, with sale particularly high in November and December 2012, due in part to various sales on the App Store. Upon announcement of the 400 Days content, Telltale reported that over 17 million episodes have been purchased across all platforms worldwide, while by October 2013, at the time of the formal announcement of Season Two, over 21 million episodes have been sold. As of July 28, 2014, 28 million episodes have been sold.

Accolades
The Walking Dead has been described as representing a revitalization of the adventure game genre, which had been in decline since the mid-1990s. Telltale have been praised for taking their previous experiences in the genre and expanding on them, whilst also incorporating strong writing and voice acting; Gamasutra and Game Developer named the studio one of the top 10 developers in 2012.

The Walking Dead has garnered many other 2012 "Game of the Year" awards, notably from USA Today, Wired, Complex, GamesRadar and Official Xbox Magazine. The Walking Dead was awarded "Game of the Year", "Best Adapted Video Game", and "Best Downloadable Game" at the 2012 Spike Video Game Awards; Melissa Hutchison's role as Clementine was named as "Best Performance By a Human Female", while Dave Fennoy was nominated for "Best Performance by a Human Male". Telltale Games was also named as "Studio of the Year". The game was awarded "Best Downloadable Game" and "Best Character Design" for Lee Everett at the 2012 Inside Gaming Awards. The Walking Dead was Destructoid's 2012 "Game of the Year" and "Best Multi-Platform Game". Digital Trends awarded the game with "Best Writing", "Best Digitally Distributed Game", and "Game of the Year" for 2012. Yahoo! Games' Flan Dering listed The Walking Dead as his "Game of the Year" and "Best Downloadable Game" for 2012. For the 16th Annual D.I.C.E. Awards, The Walking Dead was nominated for eight awards, and won for "Adventure Game of the Year", "Downloadable Game of the Year", "Outstanding Achievement in Story", and "Outstanding Character Performance" for the character of Lee Everett. The Walking Dead won the "Best Narrative" award and received nominations for "Best Downloadable Game" and "Game of the Year" for the 2013 Game Developers Choice Awards. The Walking Dead won the "Story" and "Mobile & Handheld" awards at the 2013 British Academy Video Games Awards, and was nominated for "Best Game", "Game Design", and "Original Music" for the 2013 British Academy Video Games Awards, along with separate "Performance" nominations for Fennoy and Hutchinson for their roles as Lee and Clementine, respectively. In March 2013, the game was nominated for and won several Pocket Gamer Awards categories, including iOS Game of the Year. The Walking Dead: 400 Days won Animation, Interactive at the 2013 National Academy of Video Game Trade Reviewers (NAVGTR) awards.

See also
The Testament of Sherlock Holmes

References

External links

2012 video games
Adventure games
Android (operating system) games
BAFTA winners (video games)
D.I.C.E. Award for Adventure Game of the Year winners
Episodic video games
Interactive movie video games
IOS games
MacOS games
Nintendo Switch games
Ouya games
PlayStation 3 games
PlayStation 4 games
PlayStation Network games
PlayStation Vita games
Point-and-click adventure games
Savannah, Georgia in fiction
Spike Video Game Awards Game of the Year winners
Square Enix games
Telltale Games games
Video games about cannibalism
Video games developed in the United States
Video games featuring black protagonists
Video games featuring female protagonists
Video games featuring non-playable protagonists
Video games scored by Jared Emerson-Johnson
Video games set in Georgia (U.S. state)
Video games set in 2003
Video games with commentaries
 Video game
Windows games
Works set on trains
Xbox 360 games
Xbox 360 Live Arcade games
Xbox Cloud Gaming games
Xbox One games